Hypertrophic osteopathy is a bone disease secondary to cancer in the lungs.

Presentation
It is characterized by new bone formation on the outside of the diaphyses of long bones of the limbs, without destruction of cortical bone. Symptoms include stiffness and warm, firm swelling of the legs, and signs of lung disease such as coughing and difficulty breathing. Hypertrophic osteopathy in humans differs from a similar condition in dogs, in that in humans it is usually caused by lung tumors or infections such as Mycobacterium fortuitum or Corynebacterium.  The most common cause in dogs is primary or metastatic pulmonary neoplasia.  Other potential causes in dogs include heartworm disease, heart disease, and pulmonary abscesses.  It has also been associated with nonpulmonary diseases such as renal tumors and rhabdomyosarcoma of the bladder.  At least once it has been caused by congenital megaesophagus in a six-year-old dog.  Hypertrophic osteopathy is rare in cats.

Causes
One theory is that hypertrophic osteopathy is caused by increased blood flow to the ends of the legs, overgrowth of connective tissue, and then new bone formation surrounding the bones.  This is secondary to nerve stimulation by the lung disease.  The condition may reverse if the lung mass is removed or if the vagus nerve is cut on the affected side.

See also
 Hypertrophic pulmonary osteoarthropathy

References

Dog diseases